Potamonautes isimangaliso is a species of freshwater crustacean in the family Potamonautidae. It is endemic to iSimangaliso Wetland Park, South Africa. Its natural habitat are the ephemeral wetlands fringing the western shores of False Bay. Molecular DNA analyses were required to distinguish it from the similar and rather variable P. lividus, which occurs further inland.

Description
It most closely resembles P. lividus but its mtDNA differs from the former by between 7.4 and 7.8%. It is further distinguished by its unique suite of carapace characters, besides its colouration and size.

Habitat
It occurs in oxygen-poor, fresh ephemeral pans.

References

Fauna of South Africa
Potamoidea
Freshwater crustaceans of Africa
Crustaceans described in 2015